Muhammad Hairiey Hakim bin Mamat (born 14 January 2000) is a Malaysian professional footballer who plays as a left-back for Malaysia Super League club Terengganu.

Career statistics

Club

References

External links
 

2000 births
Living people
Malaysian footballers
Terengganu F.C. II players
Terengganu FC players
Malaysia Super League players
Malaysian people of Malay descent
Association football defenders
Competitors at the 2021 Southeast Asian Games
Southeast Asian Games competitors for Malaysia